Torodora epitriona is a moth in the family Lecithoceridae first described by Kyu-Tek Park in 2002. It is endemic to Chiang Mai, Thailand.

The forewings are pale greyish orange, somewhat shiny or almost transparent, but without markings. The hindwings are pale greyish orange.

Etymology
The species name refers to the needle-shaped lobes of the juxta and is derived from Greek epetrion.

References

Torodora
Moths of Asia
Endemic fauna of Thailand
Moths described in 2002